1,3-Dimethylbutylamine (1,3-DMBA, dimethylbutylamine, DMBA, 4-amino-2-methylpentane, or AMP), is a stimulant drug structurally related to methylhexanamine where a butyl group replaces the pentyl group. The compound is an aliphatic amine. 

The hydrochloride and citrate salts of DMBA has been identified as unapproved ingredients in some over-the-counter dietary supplements, in which it is used in an apparent attempt to circumvent bans on methylhexanamine. The U.S. Food and Drug Administration (FDA) considers any dietary supplement containing DMBA to be "adulterated".  Despite the FDA's opposition, DMBA continues to be sold in the US.

There are no known human safety studies on DMBA and its health effects are entirely unknown.

References

Alkylamines
Norepinephrine releasing agents
Stimulants
Sympathomimetics
Designer drugs